The Demosthenian Literary Society is a literary society focused on extemporaneous debate at the University of Georgia in Athens, Georgia. It is among the oldest literary societies in the English-speaking world and was founded on February 19, 1803 by the first graduating class of the University's Franklin College. The object of the Society is "to promote the cause of science and truth by the cultivation of oratory and the art of debate at weekly meetings." It is named after the Greek orator Demosthenes.

The Society meets every Thursday during the academic school year at 7pm and once during the summer in Demosthenian Hall on UGA's North Campus. In addition to its relations with other organizations at the University of Georgia, like the Phi Kappa Literary Society, the Society maintains relationships with other Literary and Debate societies across the United States, including the Philodemic Society at Georgetown University, the Dialectic and Philanthropic Societies at UNC-Chapel Hill and the Philolexian Society at Columbia University.

History
Augustin Clayton, James Jackson, and Williams Rutherford are recognized as the founding fathers of Demosthenian. Clayton became the first student to receive his diploma from Franklin College and went on to become a federal judge and a U.S. Representative from Georgia, with Georgia's Clayton County being named in his honor. Rutherford and Jackson went on to become professors at Franklin College.

After 167 years of male-only membership, the first female members of the Society were inducted on March 4, 1970. President Sherrill Watkins presided over the initiation of Kathy Conrad, a freshman from Atlanta, and Bebe Herring, a junior from Athens. By the late 1970s, female members were heavily active in the Society and held numerous offices—even President. Today, the Society has slightly more female than male members.

Citing issues of student disenfranchisement within the UGA and U.S. political systems, the Society voted in 2012 to secede from the United States of America as the micronation 'Demosthenia.' This resolution was acknowledged as a move to raise the Society's profile and to encourage lively debate.

In the wake of the Unite the Right rally in Charlottesville, Virginia in August 2017, the society removed their portrait of Confederate general and honorary member Robert E. Lee from their building. The debate attracted significant media attention, with various newspapers such as the Red and Black appearing for the debate. The motion was passed by a unanimous vote of 27-0.

Demosthenian Hall
Demosthenian Hall was constructed by Dr. James Tinsley in 1824. It is the fourth oldest building at the University of Georgia and was placed on the National Register for Historic Places in 1971. The construction was financed by the Society's members, alumni, and friends. It remains the only building on the UGA campus that was privately financed and is not wholly owned by the University.

In 1997, Demosthenian Hall received $200,000 in donations for the purpose of restoring the hall. The construction work restored the ceiling medallion and the rest of the Upper Chamber to its original 1824 layout and color scheme. The original hardwood floors were uncovered and restored in the Lower Chamber.

The Upper Chamber
The Upper Chamber is the meeting room of the Society. The speaker's lectern has been dated to the 1820s and may have been built specifically for the Hall. The simplicity of the carved mantels, window moldings, doors and deep paneled wainscoting emphasizes the drama of the ornate plasterwork ceiling medallion which is based on a template designed by Asher Benjamin. It is a medallion of holly leaves surrounded by swags of smaller leaves which are framed by delicate filigree. This ceiling is one of the most architecturally unique structures at the University of Georgia and is one of the few remaining examples of this form of decorative artwork.

The Lower Chamber
The Lower Chamber is into one main room flanked on the right by two smaller rooms - designated the President's Office and the Library. Containing mostly donated furniture constructed in the late 18th and early 19th century, the Society has endeavored to maintain the historic feel of the rooms.

The Library
The Society has maintained an extensive library since its founding and currently owns over 2000 volumes. Its collection surpassed that of the University's main library for the majority of the 19th century. Upon the reopening of the University after the Civil War, the Society donated its books to the University to replace the library collection that had been burned. Demosthenian maintains extensive archives of past meeting minutes, Society business, and members. In addition, the most recent minutes and some historical minutes from 1829 are available online.

Organization of the Society

Meetings
The Demosthenian Literary Society was founded for the specific purpose of promoting the art of extemporaneous speech. During meetings, members introduce original resolutions that have not been shared with others prior to their presentation. This method of debate challenges members and guests to formulate speeches based on solely prior knowledge and without extensive preparation. Speakers are also subject to questions from the audience and are limited to speeches of up to five minutes in length. Each meeting of the Demosthenian Literary Society is run in accordance with Parliamentary Procedure as set out in Robert's Rules of Order.

Officer Positions
After being active members for a designated amount of time and completing adequate service to the Society, members are eligible to run for officer positions.  The Society has 13 officers: President, Vice President, Secretary, Chief Justice, two Associate Justices, Treasurer, Hall Administrator, Hall Preservationist, Historian, Sergeant-at-Arms, Librarian and Custodian.  The offices of Treasurer, Hall Administrator, Hall Preservationist, and Historian are all year-long positions elected every Spring while the others are elected each semester.

Faculty Advisors
These advisors are members of the University of Georgia faculty and serve as a liaisons between the University and the Society. Notable faculty advisors who have greatly contributed to the Society include: Albert B. Saye and Dr. Cal Logue (1981- 1988).

Recent faculty advisors include:

 Dr. Daniel Kapust (? - 2008)
 Dr. John Murphy (2008- 2011)
 Dr. John Knox (2011- 2017)
 Professor Hatidža Mulić (2018- 2019)
Dr. Cassia Roth (2019- present)

Annual Programs and Traditions

All Night Meeting
On the Saturday that falls closest to the anniversary of the Society's founding, the All Night Meeting is hosted at Demosthenian Hall. The All Night Meeting lasts for twelve hours, from 7pm Saturday to 7am Sunday. Dinner is served and then the meeting opens with guest keynote speakers; the meeting then continues with debate among current members, guests, and alumni of the Society throughout the night and into the morning. Each year at the All Night Meeting, current members are recognized for their service and devotion to the Society by being awarded with Speaker's Keys.

Hat Debate
Starting in 1995, the Thursday closest to Halloween has been designated as the date that the Demosthenian Literary Society hosts the annual Hat Debate. Members submit resolutions (usually of a humorous nature) and challenges (certain tasks people must complete during their speeches) before the program that are then put in a hat to be drawn from. Participants are called up one-by-one to the lecturn, pull out a resolution and/or challenge, and then must immediately present a speech in the affirmative while completing the drawn challenge.

Orations and Declamations
Once a year in early April, the Society hosts a program dedicated to presenting orations and declamations, speeches that are originally written by the presenter and those not written by the presenter, respectively. Members may compete in each category of prepared speech for an award of one speaker's point. The Judicial Council judges the orations and declamations and declares the winners at the following meeting.

Intersociety Debate
Each spring, the Demosthenian and the Phi Kappa Literary Societies hold a debate to highlight the oratory skills of the societies' best speakers. Due to a change in relations between the two societies, the 2020 Intersociety Debate is being held between the Demosthenian Literary Society and the Georgia Debate Union. Debate is usually held in the Hatton-Lovejoy courtroom at the University of Georgia School of Law. Judges are randomly selected for the debate from a pool of nominations submitted by members of both societies.

Notable alumni
Rachel Aaron, fantasy and science fiction author
William Yates Atkinson, Governor of Georgia 
John Barrow, U.S. Congressman
Pope Barrow, U.S. Senator
Robert Benham, first African-American chief justice, Georgia Supreme Court
William Tapley Bennett Jr., diplomat
D. W. Brooks, founder of Gold Kist
John A. Campbell, U.S. Supreme Court Justice
William Ragsdale Cannon, American United Methodist bishop
Augustin Clayton, Statesman, Judge, U.S. Congressman from Georgia
Hugh M. Dorsey, Governor of Georgia
Tim Echols, Georgia Public Service Commissioner 
Joel Furr, first person to refer to junk e-mail as "spam"
Benjamin Harvey Hill, U.S. and Confederate States Senator
Arthur Hinds, member of the Celtic/Pagan band Emerald Rose
Phil Kent, political consultant
Jack Kingston, U.S. Congressman
Crawford Long, Physician, best known for the first use of inhaled sulfuric ether as an anesthetic, first obstetric anesthetist
Eugene Patterson- Civil Rights activist, Pulitzer Prize-winning author, and publisher of the Pentagon Papers
Count Emilio Pucci, fashion designer
Ralph Reed, political consultant
Charles Henry Smith, better known as writer Bill Arp
Herman E. Talmadge, U.S. Senator and former governor of Georgia
Robert Toombs, first Secretary of State of the Confederate States of America, U.S. Senator and Congressman
Beth Shapiro, Rhodes Scholar and recipient of a MacArthur Foundation "Genius Grant"
Emory Speer, Post-civil war equal rights advocate and federal judge
A.E. Stallings, poet & translator (recipient of a MacArthur Foundation "Genius Grant")
Bob Trammell, former Minority Leader of the Georgia House of Representatives

See also

Other Historic American Debate Societies
 The Philolexian Society of Columbia University
 The Philomathean Society of the University of Pennsylvania
The Phi Kappa Literary Society of the University of Georgia
 The American Whig-Cliosophic Society of Princeton University
 The Philodemic Society of Georgetown University
 The Washington Literary Society and Debating Union and Jefferson Literary and Debating Society of the University of Virginia
 The Union-Philanthropic (Literary) Society of Hampden–Sydney College
 The Dialectic and Philanthropic Societies of the University of North Carolina at Chapel Hill
 The Euphradian Society of the University of South Carolina

Related
 : Cambridge Union Society
 : Oxford Union Society
 : The Durham Union Society
 : London School of Economics, Grimshaw International Relations Club
 : Yale Debate Association
 : Berkeley Forum
 : Olivaint Conférence
 : Olivaint Conference of Belgium
 : Debattierclub Stuttgart
 : Common Sense Society Budapest
 : Queen's Debating Union

References

Further reading
Coulter, E. Merton. College Life in the Old South. Reprint edition. Athens, Ga.: University of Georgia Press, c1983.

Student debating societies
College literary societies in the United States
University of Georgia
University of Georgia campus
1803 establishments in Georgia (U.S. state)